This list of museums in Nevada encompasses museums which are defined for this context as physical institutions, (including nonprofit organizations, government entities, and private businesses) that collect and care for objects of cultural, artistic, scientific, or historical interest and make their collections or related exhibits available for public viewing. Defunct museums are listed in a separate section.

Museums

Defunct museums
 American Heroes Veteran Museum, Laughlin in the Ramada Express Hotel
 Casino Legends Hall of Fame Museum, in the Tropicana Resort & Casino, Las Vegas
 Debbie Reynolds' Movie Museum, in the Convention Center Drive Hotel-Casino, Las Vegas
 Elvis-A-Rama Museum - Las Vegas - Biography
 Guggenheim Hermitage Museum - Las Vegas - Art
 Guinness World Records Museum, Las Vegas
 Hispanic Museum of Nevada, Las Vegas, closed in 2017
 Houdini's Museum, Las Vegas, closed in 2004
 King Tut Exhibit, formerly at the Luxor, Las Vegas
 Las Vegas Art Museum, Las Vegas, closed in 2009.
 Liberace Museum, Las Vegas, closed in 2010, collections on traveling display
 Liberty Belle Slot Collection, closed in 2006, located at the Liberty Belle Casino in Reno, now displayed at the Nevada State Museum, Carson City
 Lost Vegas Historical Gambling Museum, Las Vegas
 Magic and Movie Hall of Fame, located in O'Shea's Casino,
 Midas Schoolhouse, destroyed by fire in 2005
 Silver State National Peace Officers Museum, Virginia City, now on online museum known as the American Peace Officer Virtual Museum
 Sunbelt Auto Museum, Las Vegas, private collection of Jim Rogers, collection sold at auction in 2015
Star Trek: The Experience - The History of the Future Museum, Las Vegas Hilton, closed 2008, may reopen in the Neonopolis Mall in Las Vegas 
 Stewart Indian School Museum, closed in the late 1990s, campus still open for walking tours, website
 Western Historic Radio Museum, Virginia City, closed in 2012
 World of Coca-Cola, Las Vegas

See also
 Aquaria in Nevada (category)
 Botanical gardens in Nevada (category)
 Nature Centers in Nevada

Resources
Nevada Museums Association
Historical Museum Guide for Nevada
Nevada Culture: Museums

References

Museums
Nevada
Museums